Jati Umra (Punjabi) is a neighbourhood located within union council 124 (Sultanke) in Iqbal Tehsil of Lahore, Punjab, Pakistan.

History
Jati Umra is Sharif family's palatial estate near Lahore and is named after their Indian ancestral town of Jati Umra, Tarn Taran Sahib near Amritsar in Punjab, India. Mian Muhammad Sharif was born and lived in India's Jati Umra before migrating to Lahore in 1932.

See also
 Raiwind Palace

References

Iqbal Town, Lahore
Sharif family